Chromium(III) oxide (or chromia) is an inorganic compound with the formula . It is one of the principal oxides of chromium and is used as a pigment. In nature, it occurs as the rare mineral eskolaite.

Structure and properties
Similar to corundum,  is a hard, brittle material (Mohs hardness 8 to 8.5). It is antiferromagnetic up to 307 K, the Néel temperature. It is not readily attacked by acids.

Occurrence

 occurs naturally as the mineral eskolaite, which is found in chromium-rich tremolite skarns, metaquartzites, and chlorite veins. Eskolaite is also a rare component of chondrite meteorites. The mineral is named after Finnish geologist Pentti Eskola.

Production
It is derived from the mineral chromite, . The conversion of chromite to chromia proceeds via , which is reduced with sulfur at high temperatures:
  +  S  →    +  

The oxide is also formed by the decomposition of chromium salts such as chromium nitrate, or by the exothermic decomposition of ammonium dichromate.

 →  +  + 4 

The reaction has a low ignition temperature of less than 200 °C and is frequently used in “volcano” demonstrations.

Applications
Because of its considerable stability, chromia is a commonly used pigment. It was originally called viridian. It is used in paints, inks, and glasses. It is the colorant in "chrome green" and "institutional green." Chromium(III) oxide is a precursor to the magnetic pigment chromium dioxide, by the following reaction:
 + 3   →  5   +  

Along with many other oxides, it is used as a compound when polishing (also called stropping) the edges of knives, razors, surfaces of optical devices etc. on a piece of leather, balsa, cloth or other material. It is available in powder or wax form, and in this context it is known as "green compound".

It is used as a component of refractories due to its high melting point.

From 1962, it has been used as an inert marker in livestock intake research. However, its use in animal science research has been diminishing with the increased use of Titanium dioxide due to the latter being consider more food safe, allowing for the public sale of animals used in research trials that use an inert digestion marker.

Reactions
Chromium(III) oxide is amphoteric.

When heated with finely divided carbon or aluminium, it is reduced to chromium metal:
  + 2 Al → 2 Cr + 
Unlike the classic thermite reaction involving iron oxides, the chromium oxide thermite creates few or no sparks, smoke or sound, but glows brightly. Because of the very high melting point of chromium, chromium thermite casting is impractical.

Heating with chlorine and carbon yields chromium(III) chloride and carbon monoxide:
  + 3  + 3 C → 2  + 3 CO

Chromates can be formed by the oxidation of chromium(III) oxide and another oxide in a basic environment:
 2  + 4 MO + 3  → 4

See also
 Chromium(II) oxide
 Chromium(IV) oxide
 Chromium trioxide
 Chromic acid
 Green pigments
 List of inorganic pigments
 Refractory

References

Chromium(III) compounds
Transition metal oxides
Inorganic pigments
Alchemical substances
Abrasives
Sesquioxides
Glass dyes